WMTE can refer to:

 WMTE-FM, a radio station (101.5 FM) licensed to Manistee, Michigan, United States
 WMTE (AM), a defunct radio station (1340 AM) formerly licensed to Manistee, Michigan